| tries = {{#expr:
 + 1 + 8 + 7 + 8 + 3 + 7
 + 8 + 4 + 5 + 9 + 7 + 9
 + 6 + 5 + 1 + 4 + 5 + 5
 + 11 + 8 + 9 + 3 + 6 + 9
 + 6 + 2 + 6 + 7 + 13 + 6
 + 11 + 8 + 4 + 7 + 2 + 10
 + 3 + 5 + 10 + 11 + 6 + 5
 + 6 + 5 + 10 + 3 + 4 + 5
 + 3 + 6 + 9 + 6 + 7 + 5
 + 5 + 2 + 9 + 9 + 9 + 2
 + 5 + 14 + 9 + 8 + 9
 + 6 + 4 + 4 + 4 + 3
 + 6 + 4 + 6 + 7 + 6 + 2
 + 5 + 4 + 6 + 8 + 8 + 6
 + 4 + 7 + 8 + 6 + 5 + 7
 + 11 + 7 + 7 + 8 + 10 + 3
 + 5 + 6 + 8 + 7 + 6 + 4
 + 7 + 8 + 7 + 6 + 6 + 7
 + 5 + 8 + 8 + 9 + 8 + 5
 + 10 + 10 + 7 + 8 + 10 + 7
 + 7 + 9 + 6 + 6 + 5
 + 2 + 9 + 5 + 9 + 8 + 9
 + 8 + 8 + 10 + 6 + 8 + 7
 + 8 + 9 + 10 + 12 + 7 + 11
 + 11 + 2 + 7 + 7 + 4 + 10
 + 13 + 9 + 3 + 14 + 9 + 10
 + 8 + 3
 + 2
}}
| top point scorer =  George Ford (Leicester Tigers) – 220 points
| top try scorer =  Max Malins (Saracens) – 16 tries
| website    = www.premiershiprugby.com
| prevseason = 2020–21
| nextseason = 2022–23
|teams=13
}}

The 2021–22 Premiership Rugby was the 35th season of the top flight of English domestic rugby union competition and the fourth to be sponsored by Gallagher. It is also the first since 1992–93 to feature thirteen teams. The competition was broadcast by BT Sport for the ninth successive season with four league season games and the final also simulcast free-to-air on ITV. Highlights of each weekend's games were shown on ITV with extended highlights on BT Sport.

The reigning champions entering the season were Harlequins who claimed their 2nd title after defeating Exeter Chiefs in the 2021 final. Saracens were promoted as champions from the 2020–21 RFU Championship at the first attempt.

Due to changes to the global rugby calendar implemented in 2020 and the COVID-19 pandemic causing a moratorium to be placed on relegation last season, the tournament features thirteen teams and will include an extra four rounds. The season would take place over 40 weeks.

Rule changes 

This season sees the second year of a three-year moratorium on relegation from the league.

Salary cap 
This season is the first under the reduced salary cap regulations before changes are made before 2024–25. A brief summary of the changes are:
 Senior ceiling is reduced from £6.4m to £5m.
 Homegrown player credits retained up to £600,000
 International and EPS credits retained but limited to £400,000.
 Season-long loan salary cap exemption is removed.
 Academy ceiling for international players retained at £100,000 but with maximum salary increasing from £30,000 to £50,000. Homegrown academy players are not counted in the £100,000 limit.
 For contracts continuing into 2021–22, the cap cost will be counted at 75% of their actual value to manage transition to the new caps.
 Two players continue to be excluded from the salary cap for this season.

Teams 
For the first time since the 2002–03 Premiership Rugby season, all teams from the previous season will compete in the league together with Saracens who were promoted from the 2020–21 RFU Championship after an absence of one year, thus making a thirteen team league.

Stadiums and locations

Table

Regular season 
Fixtures for the season were announced by Premiership Rugby on 13 July 2021. The league season begins on 17 September 2021 and is due to end on 18 June 2022. Each team receives two bye weeks. Highlights of the season include:
 Big Game 13 – Harlequins would host Northampton Saints in this season's edition at Twickenham Stadium on 27 December 2021.
 The Showdown – Part 2 – Saracens would host Bristol Bears at Tottenham Hotspur Stadium on 26 March 2022.
 Big Summer Kick-Off – Harlequins would host Gloucester in the inaugural event at Twickenham Stadium on 21 May 2022.
All fixtures are subject to change.

Round 1

Round 2

Round 3

Round 4

Round 5

Round 6

Round 7

Round 8

Round 9

Round 10

Round 11

Round 12

Round 13

Round 14

Round 15

Round 16

Round 17

Round 18

Round 19

Round 20

Round 21

Round 22

Round 23

Round 24

Round 25

Round 26

Play-offs 
As in previous seasons, the top four teams in the Premiership table, following the conclusion of the regular season, contest the play-off semi-finals in a 1st vs 4th and 2nd vs 3rd format, with the higher ranking team having home advantage. The two winners of the semi-finals then meet in the Premiership Final at Twickenham on 18 June 2022.

Semi-finals

Final

Leading scorers 
Note: Flags to the left of player names indicate national team as has been defined under World Rugby eligibility rules, or primary nationality for players who have not yet earned international senior caps. Players may hold one or more non-WR nationalities.

Most points 

Source:

Most tries 

Source:

Season attendances

By club 

 Attendances do not include the final or cancelled games.

Highest attendances

Notes

References

External links
 

 
2021-22
Premiership Rugby
England